Elia is a Greek village in Sithonia, on the Chalkidiki peninsula in Central Macedonia. The village is located 12 kilometers from the ancient settlement of Nikiti and the resort town of Neos Marmaras. Elia dates back to the Byzantine period.

This region, with its many beachside hotels, is a popular summer tourist destination.

References

External links 
 Halkidiki Tourism

Beaches of Greece
Chalkidiki
Villages in Greece